Grain storage structures – also known as bins or wheat bins in local popular usage – are grain silos spread around Western Australia, primarily in the wheatbelt region, at grain receival locations.

Historically they have been linked with the Wheatbelt railway lines of Western Australia, and the transport of grain to the ports of Western Australia for export by the CBH Group.

Structure types

In 2003, CBH published a document "Co-operative Bulk Handling Ltd's grain storage system in Western Australia".

Historically there were major structures found at Midland/Bellevue, it was a rail based storage while at Fremantle and Bunbury there were grain storage silos that were part of the port loading facilities.

The identification of the types of installations was made as follows:

 Horizontal 'H' type (1933+) circular wall
 Horizontal 'A' type (1960–1983) (85 in 2003)
 Horizontal 'B' type (1962–1982) (31 in 2003)
 Horizontal 'C' type (1966–1967) (5 in 2003)
 Horizontal 'D' type (1967–1982) (48 in 2003)
 Horizontal 'E' type (1969–1971) (20 in 2003)
 Horizontal 'F' type (1990) ( 1 in 2003)
 Horizontal 'G' type (1978–1982) (36 in 2003)
 Silo       'K' type (1980–1981) (26 in 2003)
 Silo       'L' type (1982) (19 in 2003)
 Circular   'M' type (1973–1994) (11 in 2003)
 Open Bulk Head 'O' type (1975–2003) (number unknown)
 Roofed Bulk Head 'P' type (1986–1989) (3 in 2003)
 Horizontal 'Q' type (1995–2000) (12 in 2003)
 Silo       'S' type (2000–2003) (number unknown)
 Circular   'X' type
 Bulkwest CS2000 Series (102 in 2003)
 Circular Domes (1994) (4 in 2003)

Table

Metro Grain Centre
The Perth based Metro Grain Centre is located on Abernethy Road in Forrestfield. It is connected by road and rail with the port in Fremantle, for container shipping, and Kwinana port for bulk handling of grain. It opened in March 1998 and can store 200,000 tonnes of grain.

Port silos

Bunbury
Grain silos built at Bunbury in 1937, were decommissioned in the 1980s, and have been re-styled as accommodation since 1994.

Fremantle
Built on the North Quay in 1948, the Fremantle grain silos were demolished in 2000 after a heritage application was rejected by the Minister for Planning.

Notes

References

Grain receival points of Western Australia
CBH Group